HMS D8 was one of eight D-class submarines built for the Royal Navy during the first decade of the 20th century.

Description
The D-class submarines were designed as improved and enlarged versions of the preceding C class, with diesel engines replacing the dangerous petrol engines used earlier. D3 and subsequent boats were slightly larger than the earlier boats. They displaced  on the surface and  submerged. The D-class submarines had a crew of 25 officers and ratings and were the first to adopt saddle tanks.

For surface running, the boats were powered by two  diesels, each driving one propeller shaft. When submerged each propeller was driven by a  electric motor. They could reach  on the surface and  underwater.

The boats were armed with three 18-inch (45 cm) torpedo tubes, two in the bow and one in the stern. They carried one reload for each tube, a total of six torpedoes.

Construction and career
D8 was laid down on 14 February 1910 by Chatham Dockyard. The submarine was launched on 23 September 1911 and was commissioned on 23 March 1912.

D8 was sold on 19 December 1921 to Pounds.

Notes

References
 
 
 
 

 

British D-class submarines
1911 ships
Royal Navy ship names